Roger D. Chase is a South Dakota politician, and currently serves in the South Dakota House of Representatives.

References

Living people
Republican Party members of the South Dakota House of Representatives
21st-century American politicians
Year of birth missing (living people)